Thomas Moriarty (1928 – 16 January 2002) was an Irish Gaelic footballer. At club level he played with Austin Stacks, Dohenys and Clonakilty and was a member of the Cork and Kerry senior football teams. Moriarty usually lined out as a midfielder.

Career

Moriarty first came to Gaelic football prominence as a student with Tralee CBS, winning consecutive Corn Uí Mhuirí titles in 1944 and 1945. By this stage he had already began his adult club career with the Austin Stacks club. His occupation as a bank official resulted in him joining lining out with a number of clubs, firstly with Dohenys in Dunmanway and later with Clonakilty. He captained the latter to a County Championship success in 1952. Moriarty first appeared on the inter-county scene as captain of the Kerry minor football team that won the All-Ireland Minor Championship in 1946. He was drafted onto the Kerry senior football team in 1949 but later won an All-Ireland Junior Championship title with Cork in 1951. This success resulted in his elevation to the senior team and he won National League and Munster Championship titles in 1952. Moriarty declared for Kerry in February 1953, however, he was later served with a 12-month suspension for lining out in a rugby game. He resumed his position on the Kerry team the following year and won three Munster Championship titles in five seasons as well as an All-Ireland Championship title in 1955. Moriarty's career was brought to a premature end when he broke his leg during the 1958 All-Ireland semi-final defeat by Derry.

Personal life and death

Born in Cappagh, Castlegregory, Moriarty began his banking career with AIB in Dunmanway, before progressing through the ranks in Clonakilty and Cork city. He was then chosen on a specialist team to set up the British operations of AIB. Moriarty returned to Cork for a period before taking up the position of manager of the Castle Street branch of AIB in Tralee in the early 1970s. He was appointed Regional Manager for Kerry in 1975 and, six years later, was appointed General Manager West, based in Galway. He retired in 1988.

Moriarty died on 16 January 2002, aged 73.

Honours

Tralee CBS
Corn Uí Mhuirí: 1944, 1945

Clonakilty
Cork Senior Football Championship: 1952 (c)

Cork
Munster Senior Football Championship: 1952
National Football League: 1951-52
All-Ireland Junior Football Championship: 1951
Munster Junior Football Championship: 1951

Kerry
All-Ireland Senior Football Championship: 1955
Munster Senior Football Championship: 1954, 1955, 1958
All-Ireland Minor Football Championship: 1946 (c)
Munster Minor Football Championship: 1945, 1946 (c)

Munster
All-Ireland Inter-Provincial Colleges Football Championship: 1947 (c)

References

1928 births
2002 deaths
Austin Stacks Gaelic footballers
Dohenys Gaelic footballers
Clonakilty Gaelic footballers
Kerry inter-county Gaelic footballers
Cork inter-county Gaelic footballers
Munster inter-provincial Gaelic footballers
Gaelic games players from County Kerry